Spin The Bottle is the fourth studio album by The Blackeyed Susans, released in July 1997 on Hi Gloss Records. Initial copies came with a karaoke disc containing instrumental versions of each song. The album was produced  by Victor Van Vugt (Nick Cave and the Bad Seeds, Dave Graney and the Coral Snakes, Luna) and featured ten new original songs and a cover of Billie Holiday's "You're My Thrill". Three singles were released from the album - "Smokin' Johnny Cash", "Spin the Wheel" and "Blue Skes, Blue Sea".

Track listing 
All songs written by Phil Kakulas, except where noted.

 "Spin The Wheel" – 3:52
 "I Am A Singer" – 3:54
 "Everything I Touch" (Phil Kakulas, Kiernan Box) – 3:43
 "Smokin’ Johnny Cash" (Phil Kakulas, Rob Snarski, Mark Dawson) – 3:47
 "Bottle Of Red" – 4:58
 "Blue Skies, Blue Sea" (Phil Kakulas, Rob Snarski) – 4:03
 "Untitled" – 4:10
 "You’re My Thrill" (J Gorney, S Clare) – 5:07
 "Sweeter Deal" (Kiernan Box, Rob Snarski, Phil Kakulas) – 3:56
 "Look Away" (Phil Kakulas, Dan Luscome, Rob Snarski) – 6:30
 "You’re A Good Doctor" (Phil Kakulas, Rob Snarski, Mark Halstead) – 3:15

Personnel 
 Rob Snarski – vocals, guitars, whistling
 Phil Kakulas – bass, omnichord
 Kiernan Box – piano, organ, harmonium
 Dan Luscombe – guitars, optigan, vocals, organ
 Mark Dawson – drums, percussion
 Jen Anderson – violin
 Suzanne Simpson - violin
 Deirdre Dowling – viola
 Helen Mountfort – cello
 Matthew Habben – saxophone
 Ken Gardner – trumpet
 Adam Hutterer – trombone
 Mark C Halstead – backing vocals
 Graham Lee – pedal steel, backing vocals
 Lisa Miller – backing vocals
 Jodie Meehan – backing vocals
 Kelly Nash – backing vocals

References

External links
 

The Blackeyed Susans albums
1997 albums
Albums produced by Victor Van Vugt